The 9th Qatar International Friendship Tournament was held in Doha, Qatar from 27 December 2009 to 2 January 2010. 

The edition featured full senior national teams for the first time and also reverted to four teams from eight on previous editions.

Participating nations

 Qatar
 Iran
 Korea DPR 
 Mali

Matches

Round robin tournament

Winner 

2009
International
2009–10 in Iranian football
2009 in North Korean football
2009 in Malian sport